The Portrait of Emperor Maximilian I is an oil painting by Albrecht Dürer, dating to 1519 and now at the Kunsthistorisches Museum of Vienna, Austria. It portrays the emperor Maximilian I.

History
In the Spring of 1512, the newly elected emperor Maximilian I of Habsburg sojourned in Nuremberg, where he got acquainted with  Dürer. To celebrate the emperor and his house, the artist conceived the large Triumphal Arch woodcut, for which he was rewarded with 100 yearly florins. 

In 1518, during the Diet of Augsburg, Maximilian called Dürer to portray him. The artist met the emperor in the castle and made a pencil drawing of him, from which he later painted the panel portrait. On the drawing's margin, he noted: "Is the emperor Maximilian that I Albrecht Dürer portrayed in Augsburg, up in the high palace, in his small room, Monday 28 June 1518".

The oil panel was completed when the emperor had already died, with some variants from the initial drawing. The latter is now housed in the Albertina, Vienna.

Description

The emperor is portrayed from  three-quarter  on a green background. The arms lie on an unseen parapet coinciding with the lower boundary of the painting, according to the Flemish painting tradition. His left hand holds a large pomegranate (his personal symbol), a symbol of cohesion in diversity and thus of the Holy Roman Empire (the grains representing his subjects).

According to Stabius's explanation on the Arch of Honour, the symbolism behind the pomegranate  is like this, "although a pomegranate's exterior is neither very beautiful nor endowed with a pleasant scent, it is sweet on the inside and is filled with a great many well-shaped seeds. Likewise the Emperor is endowed with many hidden qualities which became more and more apparent each day and continue to bear fruit."

Maximilian wears a gown with a very wide fur collar and a broad-brimmed dark hat, with a brooch in the center. His grey hair crown his aged (Maximilian was 59 at the time) but still aristocratic face.

In the upper left is the Habsburg coat of arms and Golden Fleece chain, near a long inscription in capital characters which gives the titles and the deeds of the emperor.

Comparation with related works of Albrecht Dürer

Katherine Crawford Luber compares the more famous Vienna painting, likely a commission from Maximilian himself, with the Nuremberg version, possibly a processional banner created for the coronation of Charles V. The Nuremberg shows a younger Maximilian with more emphasized symbols of Office and Rule (whereas the Vienna painting does not even show the Order of the Golden Fleece). He is presented in half-length with his hands in a hieratic, axial position. 

The intimate meeting with Maximilian "high up in the palace in his tiny little cabinet"  seemed to leave an impression on Dürer. Luber opines that the woodcut The draughtsman drawing a portrait he produced later reflected this meeting. The man enthroned was cradling an orb just like Maximilian was holding his pomegranate.

Luber writes:
The significance of Dürer’s Maximilian portraits cannot be divined from their surface appearances alone. An understanding of how Dürer made the versions, repeating a single image, but disguising the repetitions, his crucial to interpretation of the portraits. Dürer’s ability to synthesize the representational, political, and anagogical aspects of portraiture in a single series of productions bears further testimony to his creative genius. In this unique group of portraits — drawing, woodcut, and two paintings – equivalence and variation converge within an unchanging structure as Dürer reveals and masters the complex task of Imperial portraiture.

References

Sources

External links
Page at the museum's website  

Maximilian I
1519 paintings
Paintings in the collection of the Kunsthistorisches Museum
Maximilian I